William C. Kingsley (1833–1885) was an American construction contractor who is best known for being one of the main figures involved in the creation of the Brooklyn Bridge.

Career
Kingsley settled in Brooklyn in 1856 and worked as a contractor for the Brooklyn water works. In subsequent years, his construction firm, Kingsley and Keeney, was given large contracts to build Prospect Park and the Hempstead Reservoir. But undoubtedly, Kingsley's greatest project was the Brooklyn Bridge.

By the mid-1860s, Kingsley was convinced that a bridge between New York City and Brooklyn was feasible and, perhaps most importantly, would be great for his business. He became the driving force behind that project, hiring Colonel Julius Walker Adams, a civil engineer who had worked with him on the Brooklyn sewers, to come up with a design and to prepare cost estimates. However, although Adams had previously dabbled in bridge designs and had many influential friends, he had never built a bridge of any consequence. His role was to come with a lowball estimate of the cost of the bridge, allowing Kingsley and its other promoters to gain the necessary approvals from public officials. Adams concluded that the Brooklyn Bridge could be built for $5,000,000; ultimately it would be built by John and Washington Roebling for three times that amount.

When the New York and Brooklyn Bridge Company was organized in 1867, Kingsley became one of its major shareholders. Soon, he was named its superintendent, and a motion, proposed by none other than Boss Tweed and passed by the other trustees, authorized payment to Kingsley of 15% of all construction costs. This was an unheard-of percentage for such a large contract; in 1870 alone, it amounted to $175,000 for Kingsley. In 1873, after Tweed has fallen from power, Kingsley's contract with the Bridge Company was renegotiated, and his payment was slashed to a relatively piddling flat fee of $10,000 (equal to $182,000 today) per year.

In 1875, Kingsley joined the board of trustees of the Brooklyn Bridge, and succeeded Henry Cruse Murphy as president of the board in 1882, upon Murphy's death. Kingsley held that position on May 24, 1883, the day that the Brooklyn Bridge opened.

Memorial
William C. Kingsley is interred at Green-Wood Cemetery in Brooklyn, New York. His monument was cut from granite stone that was once a part of the Brooklyn Bridge and was placed there by the bridge's Board of Trustees to honor his role in making the dream of a bridge between the great Cities of New York and Brooklyn a reality.

References

External links
 Green-Wood Cemetery Burial Search

1833 births
1885 deaths